Marcus Vinícius da Cruz Alves Nóbrega or simply Marcus Vinícius  (born March 22, 1983 in Rio de Janeiro), is a Brazilian right back. He currently plays for Clube Náutico Capibaribe on loan from Fluminense Football Club.

He also played under the name Marquinho in Portugal.

Marcus Vinícius was without a club after released by Boavista F.C. in summer 2007 & Vasco signed him on December 20, 2007.

Honours
Santa Catarina State League: 2005
Rio de Janeiro's Cup: 2006

Contract
2 January 2008 to 31 December 2010

References

External links
 CBF
 crvascodagama
 netvasco
 sambafoot
 zerozero.pt
 websoccerclub
 soccerterminal

Living people
Brazilian footballers
Footballers from Rio de Janeiro (city)
Primeira Liga players
Criciúma Esporte Clube players
Associação Atlética Ponte Preta players
Associação Portuguesa de Desportos players
Madureira Esporte Clube players
Boavista F.C. players
CR Vasco da Gama players
Duque de Caxias Futebol Clube players
Fluminense FC players
Paraná Clube players
Clube Náutico Capibaribe players
1983 births
Association football defenders